Si Mueang Chum is a village and tambon (subdistrict) of Mae Sai District, in Chiang Rai Province, Thailand. In 2005 it had a population of 5,090 people. The tambon contains nine villages.

References

Tambon of Chiang Rai province
Populated places in Chiang Rai province